Aphanopetalum clematideum is a species of twining shrub or vines that grows in the Geraldton Sandplains region of Western Australia.  It grows to approximately 5 m high from July to October, and is green-cream/green-yellow in color.

References

Saxifragales
Saxifragales of Australia
Eudicots of Western Australia